Hydron has the following meanings:

 Hydron (chemistry), a positive hydrogen cation
 Hydron (He-Man), a character in the He-Man universe